SoftCamp is a South Korean information security company founded in 1999. The company is specialized in Enterprise Digital Rights Management and Content Disarm & Reconstructions

History
SoftCamp was founded in July, 1999,

South Korean financial representative groups, including KB Financial Group, Shinhan Financial Group, and Hana Financial Group, and conglomerates, including KT Group, Hyundai-KIA Motor Company and Shinsegae Group were using SoftCamp's document security and domain security products by 2014.

The company was listed on the KOSDAQ market in December 2019.

References

Information technology companies of South Korea
Technology companies established in 1999
South Korean companies established in 1999
Security companies of South Korea
South Korean brands